Yutian County, also transliterated from Uyghur as Keriya County, is a county in Hotan Prefecture, Xinjiang Uyghur Autonomous Region, China. It is based at the Keriya Town, and is separate from Hotan County, which is another county in the same prefecture. According to the 2002 census, it has a population of 220,000. The county is bounded on the north by Aksu Prefecture, on the east by Minfeng/Niya County, on the west by Qira County and on the south by the Rutog and Gertse counties of the Tibet Autonomous Region.

Name
The county derives its Chinese name from the Kingdom of Khotan. The name was written as '' at that time. This was later changed to '' (literally, Jade Field) following the adoption of Simplified Chinese and eventually to '' in 1959. The three names have a similar pronunciation in Mandarin Chinese.

The original name of Hotan/Khotan is Gosthana/Gausthana/Gaustana, Gu-dana, Godana or Godaniya, the name used in Sanskrit cosmological texts and also how the area is historically referred to as.

Gosthana/Gausthana/Gaustana/Godana/Godaniya translates to "land of cows" in Sanskrit. The pronunciation changed over the years to Kho-tan. However, the Tibetans continue to call it Gosthana, which also carries the meaning of "land of cows".

Keriya, the English-language form of the Uyghur name for the county, is derived from the name of the Keriya River.

Yutian County is dubbed the "Home of Jade".

History 
The ancient name of Keriya was Yumi (扜彌, Gyuymi, Umi). The name Yumi was used by the Chinese envoy Zhang Qian in his 125 BCE report on his embassy's travels.

Yutian County was formed in 1882, its administrative center was Karakash, and Keriya was only a post station. In 1885, the administrative center of the county was moved to Keriya.

Aurel Stein travelled along the Keriya River in his early 20th century expeditions in the region.

In 1920, the area was part of Hotan Dao.

In 1950, the area was part of Hotan Special Area.

In 1959, the Chinese character name for the county was set as ''.

In 1977, the area became part of Hotan Prefecture.

In November 1980, the Yutian hydroelectric plant, located on the Keriya River, went into operation.

On March 21, 2008, the county was at the epicenter of a 7.1/7.3 magnitude earthquake.

In February 2014, the county was at the epicenter of the 6.8 magnitude 2014 Yutian earthquake. No injuries or deaths were reported.

In 2018, the Financial Times reported that the Yutian county vocational training centre, among the largest of the Xinjiang re-education camps, had opened a forced labour facility including eight factories spanning shoemaking, mobile phone assembly and tea packaging, giving a base monthly salary of ￥1,500 ($220). Between 2016 and 2018, the centre expanded 269 percent in total area.

In 2018, Regiment 225 (part of Kunyu, was listed as part of the county.

Administrative divisions
As of 2018, the county includes two towns and thirteen townships:

Towns:
Keriya Town (Mugala;  / ), Xambabazar (Xianbai Bazha;  / )
Townships:
Jay (Jiayi;  / ), Kokyar (Kekeya, K'o-k'o-ya;  / ), Aral (Arele;  / ), Arix (Arixi, Arish;  / ), Bogazlanggar (Langan, Lengger;  / ), Siyak (Siyeke, Siyek;  / ), Tagdaxman (Tuogeri Gazi;  / ), Karaki (Kalake'er, Qarqi;  / ), Oytograk (Aoyituo Gelake, Oytoghraq, Wo-t'o-la-k'o, Ao-i-t'o-ko-la-k'o;  / ), Aqqan (Aqiang, Achchan;  / ), Yengibag (Yingbage;  / ), Shiwol (Xiwule;  / ), Darya Boyi (Daliya Buyi, Deryaboyi, Daliya Boyi;  / /)
Others:
 National (Kunlun) Sheep Farm, Yutian Prison, Regiment 225 (part of Kunyu)

Climate

Economy
The county is known for its production of jade. Agriculture and livestock farming in the county produces corn, wheat, rice, cotton, grapes and melons. Industries in the county include jade mining, cotton ginning, tractor repair and preserved fruit processing.

Demographics
As of 2015, 277,206 of the 282,182 residents of the county were Uyghur, 4,678 were Han Chinese and 298 were from other ethnic groups.

In the late 2010s, Uyghurs made up 98.3% of the population of the county.

As of 1999, 98.56% of the population of Keriya (Yutian) County was Uyghur and 1.37% of the population was Han Chinese.

Transportation
 China National Highway 315
 Yutian Wanfang Airport

Notable persons
 Kurban Tulum, promoted by the Communist Party of China as a symbol of unity with the Uyghurs

Gallery

Notes

References

See also

County-level divisions of Xinjiang
Hotan Prefecture